The 1996 European Fencing Championships were held in Limoges, France. The competition consisted of individual events only.

Medal summary

Men's events

Women's events

Medal table

References 
 Results at the European Fencing Confederation

1996
European Fencing Championships
European Fencing Championships
International fencing competitions hosted by France